Hormiguerito, or Ormejera No. 2 in an 1858 census, (probably a garbled American version of Hormiguero), one of the smaller 19th century Pima Villages, located along the Gila River, in what is now the Gila River Indian Community in Pinal County, Arizona.  Hormiguero, Spanish for "ant hill", with the diminutive "-ito", meant Little Anthill.

References

Gila River
Geography of Pinal County, Arizona
Native American history of Arizona
History of Arizona
Former populated places in Pinal County, Arizona